Copper(II) hydroxide is the hydroxide of copper with the chemical formula of Cu(OH)2. It is a pale greenish blue or bluish green solid. Some forms of copper(II) hydroxide are sold as "stabilized" copper(II) hydroxide, although they likely consist of a mixture of copper(II) carbonate and hydroxide. Cupric hydroxide is a strong base, although its low solubility in water makes this hard to observe directly.

Occurrence
Copper(II) hydroxide has been known since copper smelting began around 5000 BC although the alchemists were probably the first to manufacture it by mixing solutions of lye (sodium or potassium hydroxide) and blue vitriol (copper(II) sulfate).  Sources of both compounds were available in antiquity.

It was produced on an industrial scale during the 17th and 18th centuries for use in pigments such as blue verditer and Bremen green. These pigments were used in ceramics and painting.

Mineral
The mineral of the formula Cu(OH)2 is called spertiniite. Copper(II) hydroxide is rarely found as an uncombined mineral because it slowly reacts with carbon dioxide from the atmosphere to form a basic copper(II) carbonate.  Thus copper slowly acquires a dull green coating in moist air by the reaction:
2 Cu(OH)2 + CO2 → Cu2CO3(OH)2 + H2O
The green material is in principle a 1:1 mole mixture of Cu(OH)2 and CuCO3. This patina forms on bronze and other copper alloy statues such as the Statue of Liberty.

Production 
Copper(II) hydroxide can be produced by adding sodium hydroxide to a solution of a soluble copper(II) salt, such as copper(II) sulfate (CuSO4·5H2O): 
2NaOH + CuSO4·5H2O → Cu(OH)2 + 6H2O + Na2SO4
The precipitate produced in this manner, however, often contains water and an appreciable amount of sodium-containing impurities.  Furthermore, this form of copper hydroxide tends to convert to black copper(II) oxide:

A purer product can be attained if ammonium chloride is added to the solution beforehand to generate ammonia in situ.  Alternatively it can be produced in a two-step procedure from copper(II) sulfate via "basic copper sulfate:"

Alternatively, copper hydroxide is readily made by electrolysis of water (containing a little electrolyte such as sodium sulfate or magnesium sulfate) with a copper anode:
Cu + 2OH− → Cu(OH)2 + 2e−

Structure 
The structure of Cu(OH)2 has been determined by X-ray crystallography  The copper center is square pyramidal.  Four Cu-O distances in the plane range are 1.96 Å, and the axial Cu-O distance is 2.36 Å.  The hydroxide ligands in the plane are either doubly bridging or triply bridging.

Reactions
It is stable to about 100 °C.

Copper(II) hydroxide reacts with a solution of ammonia to form a deep blue solution of tetramminecopper [Cu(NH3)4]2+ complex ion.

Copper(II) hydroxide catalyzes the oxidation of ammonia solutions in presence of dioxygen, giving rise to copper ammine nitrites, such as Cu(NO2)2(NH3)n.

Copper(II) hydroxide is mildly amphoteric.  It dissolves slightly in concentrated alkali, forming [Cu(OH)4]2−.

Reagent for organic chemistry
Copper(II) hydroxide has a rather specialized role in organic synthesis. Often, when it is utilized for this purpose, it is prepared in situ by mixing a soluble copper(II) salt and potassium hydroxide.

It is sometimes used in the synthesis of aryl amines. For example, copper(II) hydroxide catalyzes the reaction of ethylenediamine with 1-bromoanthraquinone or 1-amino-4-bromoanthraquinone to form 1-((2-aminoethyl)amino)anthraquinone or 1-amino-4-((2-aminoethyl)amino)anthraquinone, respectively:

Copper(II) hydroxide also converts acid hydrazides to carboxylic acids at room temperature. This conversion is useful in the synthesis of carboxylic acids in the presence of other fragile functional groups. The yields are generally excellent as is the case with the production of benzoic acid and octanoic acid:

Uses
Copper(II) hydroxide in ammonia solution, known as Schweizer's reagent, possesses the interesting ability to dissolve cellulose.  This property led to it being used in the production of rayon, a cellulose fiber.

It is also used widely in the aquarium industry for its ability to destroy external parasites in fish, including flukes, marine ich, Brooklynellosis, and marine velvet, without killing the fish. Although other water-soluble copper compounds can be effective in this role, they generally result in high fish mortality.

Copper(II) hydroxide has been used as an alternative to the Bordeaux mixture, a fungicide and nematicide. Such products include Kocide 3000, produced by Kocide L.L.C. Copper(II) hydroxide is also occasionally used as ceramic colorant.

Copper(II) hydroxide has been combined with latex paint, making a product designed to control root growth in potted plants. Secondary and lateral roots thrive and expand, resulting in a dense and healthy root system. It was sold under the name Spin Out, which was first introduced by Griffin L.L.C. The rights are now owned by SePRO Corp. It is now sold as Microkote either in a solution you apply yourself, or as treated pots.

Other copper(II) hydroxides

Together with other components, copper(II) hydroxides are numerous.  Several copper(II)-containing minerals contain hydroxide.  Notable examples include azurite, malachite, antlerite, and brochantite. Azurite (2CuCO3·Cu(OH)2) and malachite (CuCO3·Cu(OH)2) are hydroxy-carbonates, whereas antlerite (CuSO4·2Cu(OH)2) and brochantite (CuSO4·3Cu(OH)2) are hydroxy-sulfates.

Many synthetic copper(II) hydroxide derivatives have been investigated.

References

External links

Material Safety Data Sheet

Copper(II) compounds
Hydroxides
Oxidizing agents
Catalysts